John E. Tomaszewski is an American pathologist, a significant figure focusing in renal pathology, immunopathology and urological pathology, currently Distinguished Professor at University of Buffalo.

References

Year of birth missing (living people)
Living people
University at Buffalo faculty
American pathologists
LaSalle College alumni